Exit is a 2005 action-puzzle video game that was developed and published by Taito for the PlayStation Portable. It was released in Japan, on December 15, 2005, in North America on February 14, 2006, in Australia on March 30, 2006, and in Europe on March 31, 2006.  A version for Xbox Live Arcade was released on October 24, 2007. A version for the Nintendo DS was released in 2008 as Exit DS.

Overview
The basic premise is to lead the main character Mr. ESC, an escapologist, out of hospitals, underground facilities, offices and other buildings within a time limit. Along the way, the player gets hindered by obstacles such as fires, earthquakes, floods, or even meteor showers.

Sometimes the player must help trapped individuals escape as well, and it will take quick thinking and planning ahead to exit the building successfully.

Characters
Mr. ESC: A very professional escape artist with an eye for coffee like nobody's business.
Jet: What may be considered as a "villain", but is not much more than a rival escapologist with a jetpack. Only appears if you bring your companions to their doom or run out of time.
Companions: Several people throughout the scenarios of which you have to escape. May it be children, young adults, fat adults, or patients.

Gameplay
Each level includes a starting point for Mr. ESC and an exit point. There may also be one or more trapped individuals within the level, and in many cases, Mr. ESC cannot successfully complete the level unless he rescues some or all of the individuals before he escapes. There is a time limit for completing each level.

Mr. ESC is rather agile, and can swim, run faster, and jump higher, more than any of the other trapped individuals. However, he is still prone to injury from hazards or from falling off of too high heights.

The individuals come in four types:
Youngs - These normal-sized people can climb over moderate height obstacles, can jump, and can also assist each other or Mr. ESC in various tasks.
Children - Children can only climb over small heights but can be assisted by Mr. ESC or a normal adult. They cannot jump as far as adults, but can traverse passages too small for Mr. ESC or other adults.
Adults - These waddling large-sized people can push very large objects, but cannot climb over moderate obstacles without help from at least two people (MR. ESC and another adult, or two adults).
Patients - Injured people must be either carried by Mr. ESC or an adult to the exit, or, if a stretcher is available, wheeled to the exit.

Except for the injured, the player as Mr. ESC can order these people to perform certain tasks, move to specific locations, or pick up, use, or trade tools on the level; however, until Mr. ESC has touched them, they remain in a panicked state and cannot help. These individuals will not willfully put themselves in a bad situation (they will refuse to make a drop they could not survive, for example), but they can still be injured from an indirect event (dropping a crate on them, for example). If a survivor is injured, they are carried to safety by Jet (a competitor of Mr. ESC). If too many survivors are injured to be able to meet the requirement, or if Mr. ESC himself is injured, the level is over and must be restarted.

Obstacles include crates which can be used to create platforms to reach higher ledges, fires that must be extinguished before they can be passed, water hazards which only Mr. ESC can swim in, one-way doors, fallen rock walls, exposed electrical wires, and more. Some tools can be used to remove the obstacle (such as a fire extinguisher to dose a fire or a pick-axe to clear rubble). There are some levels that are dark, and a flashlight is needed to see even part of an area of the level.

After completing a level, a score is given based on the number of people rescued, and the par time for the level. 100 points are possible for each level.

There are a total of 100 different levels, which are designed to appeal to the pick-up-and-play qualities of the PSP. 70 stages are available from the start, and the player can then play through them in any order. A player can repeat the level later to try and beat their previous high score. In addition to the packaged levels, 100 more are available for download off the game's website utilizing the PSP's on-board network functionality. The Xbox Live Arcade version has a total of 220 levels.

Reception

The PSP and Xbox 360 versions received "generally favorable reviews", while the DS version received "mixed" reviews, according to video game review aggregator Metacritic.  In Japan, Famitsu gave the PSP version a score of two nines and two eights for a total of 34 out of 40.  The same magazine later gave the DS version one nine and three eights for a total of 33 out of 40.

Charles Herold of The New York Times gave the PSP version a favorable review, saying it was "tremendous fun for fans of logic puzzles, but it has a few annoying quirks. Jumping large gaps in the floor is tricky, and I died far too often doing this. The process for giving commands to other people is a bit cumbersome." Detroit Free Press gave it three stars out of four, saying that it "has enough substance to keep you playing for hours and hours." 411Mania gave the DS version a score of 7.5 out of 10, calling it "a pretty simple game with a simple premise but it's hard to master and get down to a science."  However, The Sydney Morning Herald gave the PSP version three stars out of five, calling it "A good mental workout that can prove to be addictive, despite its punishing quirks."

Sequel
In late June 2006, Famitsu revealed that Taito was working on a sequel to Exit titled Kangaeru Exit, released elsewhere as Exit 2. It was released in September 2006; a demo of the sequel was released for download in Japan in November 2006. Eventually the game was released for the Xbox Live Arcade on February 25, 2009.

References

External links
 
 
 Official Exit website 
 Official Exit website 
 Official Exit DS website

2005 video games
Nintendo DS games
PlayStation Portable games
Puzzle video games
Square Enix franchises
Taito games
MOSS (company) games
Xbox 360 Live Arcade games
Action video games
Single-player video games
Ubisoft games
Video games developed in Japan